Hagi Mohammed Awale Liban was a Somali scholar. He is noted for having designed the flag of Somalia in 1954. Liban also later served as the Chief of Cabinet of the Presidency in the nascent Somali Republic.

Awale was a nationalist who served in all Somali governments up until 1964. He maintained good relationships with the administration of Abdirashid Ali Shermarke, Awale hailed from the Majeerteen of  Darod family.

References

People from Galkayo
Somalian politicians
Somalian scholars
Flag designers